The 2022–23 season is the 116th season in the history of Sevilla FC and their 22nd consecutive season in the top flight. The club are participating in La Liga, the Copa del Rey, the UEFA Champions League, and the UEFA Europa League.

Players

Current squad

Reserve squad

Out on loan

Transfers

In

Out

Pre-season and friendlies

Competitions

Overall record

La Liga

League table

Results summary

Results by round

Matches 
The league fixtures were announced on 23 June 2022.

Copa del Rey

UEFA Champions League

Group stage

The draw for the group stage was held on 25 August 2022.

UEFA Europa League

Knockout phase

Knockout round play-offs
The knockout round play-offs draw was held on 7 November 2022.

Round of 16
The round of 16 draw was held on 24 February 2023.

Quarter-finals
The quarter-finals draw was held on 17 March 2023.

Statistics

Squad appearances and goals

|-
! colspan=14 style=background:#dcdcdc; text-align:center|Goalkeepers

|-
! colspan=14 style=background:#dcdcdc; text-align:center|Defenders

|-
! colspan=14 style=background:#dcdcdc; text-align:center|Midfielders

|-
! colspan=14 style=background:#dcdcdc; text-align:center|Forwards

|-
! colspan=14 style=background:#dcdcdc; text-align:center|Players who have made an appearance this season but have left the club

|}

References

Sevilla FC seasons
Sevilla
Sevilla